Thomas Zetzmann (born 14 December 1970) is a retired German footballer who played as a midfielder.

References

External links

1970 births
Living people
Footballers from Berlin
German footballers
Association football midfielders
Borussia Dortmund II players
Hertha BSC players
Bundesliga players
Borussia Dortmund non-playing staff
Association football coaches